Sir William Baker (5 November 1705 – 23 January 1770) was an English merchant and politician, a Member of the Parliament of Great Britain and Governor of the Hudson's Bay Company.

He was the son of John Baker, a London draper. He became an Alderman of London in 1739 and a director of the East India Company in 1741–5, 1746–50 and 1751–53. He was also deputy chairman (1749, 1751–52), chairman (1749–50, 1752–53), Deputy Governor (1750-60) and the 11th Governor (1760–70) of the Hudson's Bay Company. He was knighted in 1760.

He was MP for Plympton Erle from 1747 to 1768. In 1759 he built a country house in an estate at Bayfordbury in Hertfordshire.

He died in 1770. He had married Mary, the daughter of Jacob Tonson, publisher, and with her had 6 sons and a daughter. His eldest son, also William Baker, who inherited and improved Bayfordbury, was also an MP.

The community Baker Lake in Nunavut, Canada was named after him.

References

External link
 Rowland GM Baker's 1987 history of Boyle Farm

1705 births
1770 deaths
British MPs 1747–1754
British MPs 1754–1761
British MPs 1761–1768
Knights Bachelor
Members of the Parliament of Great Britain for Plympton Erle
People from Hertfordshire (before 1965)
Businesspeople from London
Governors of the Hudson's Bay Company
Politicians from London